The Folkton Drums are a very rare set of three decorated chalk objects in the shape of drums or solid cylinders dating from the Neolithic period. Found in a child's grave near the village of Folkton in northern England, they are now on loan to Stonehenge Visitor Centre from the British Museum. A similar object, the Burton Agnes drum was found 15 miles away near Burton Agnes in 2015, and another example, the Lavant drum, was excavated in 1993 in Lavant, West Sussex.

Their purpose remains obscure. They were given the name "drum" to describe their shape, rather than from any thought they might be percussion instruments.

Discovery
In 1889, a round prehistoric barrow was opened by the scholar and amateur archaeologist William Greenwell near Folkton in North Yorkshire. Inside, he found a neolithic grave dating to the time of Stonehenge, estimated to be between 2600 and 2000 BC. The remains of several bodies were unearthed, one of whom was a child beside which the three drums were found. The rarity of this find suggests that the child came from an elite group in society. Four years after the discovery, the drums were donated by Greenwell, along with other parts of his collection, to the British Museum.

Description
The three drum-like forms are made of locally quarried chalk and are decorated with stylized human faces and geometric patterns. On the top of the cylinders are a series of concentric circles and two of them have pairs of eyes that schematically denote a human face. The decoration of the drums has similarities to objects made in the Beaker culture and early British Bronze Age, including the use of chevron and lozenge forms. The purpose of the drums is not known for certain, although the dimensions of the drums may be significant. A study published in 2018 noted that the circumferences of the drums form whole-number divisions (ten, nine and eight times, respectively) of ten long feet, a unit of measure thought to have been widely used in Neolithic Britain. The drums could therefore have been used as measuring devices, as a means of achieving standardisation in construction at different locations, or possibly as a teaching aid. According to author Prof. Andrew Chamberlain, "The existence of these measuring devices implies an advanced knowledge in prehistoric Britain of geometry and of the mathematical properties of circles.” The study also proposed that the drums represent ceremonial objects that have uniquely survived due to their unusual material, while most objects of this type may have been made out of wood. The Lavant drum, excavated in 1993, was previously identified as being analogous to the Folkton drums in 2005 by archaeologist Anne Teather.

Legacy
Children's writer and poet Michael Rosen wrote a poem "Folkton Drums" in 2018 in connection with the University of Reading's Grave Goods project.

Display 
The three Folkton drums were displayed as part of the 2022 World of Stonehenge exhibition at the British Museum, alongside the Burton Agnes Drum, which was in the public view for the first time.

Gallery

See also
Carved stone balls
Stonehenge
Neolithic British Isles
Bush Barrow
Bronze Age Britain

References

Bibliography

H. Longworth, 'The Folkton Drums unpicked' in Grooved Ware in Britain and Ireland, Neolithic Studies Group Seminar Papers 3 (Oxford, Oxbow Books, 1999), pp. 83–88
D. V. Clarke, T. G. Cowie and A. Foxon, Symbols of power at the time of Stonehenge (London, HMSO, 1985)
I. A. Kinnes and I. H. Longworth, Catalogue of the excavated Prehistoric and Roman-British material in the Greenwell Collection (London, The British Museum Press, 1985)

Prehistoric objects in the British Museum
Stone Age sites in England
Prehistoric art
1889 archaeological discoveries